Sandgrounder Radio is an Independent Local Radio Station serving the North West Coast of England covering Southport, the Liverpool City Region, the Fylde Coast, and West Lancashire. The station broadcasts on DAB and Online.

The station started life as a 28-day RSL (Restricted Service Licence) covering Southport on FM in November 2015.

In June 2016 the station launched full time on DAB Digital Radio covering Southport and The Liverpool City Region.

In the Summer of 2020 broadcasting regulator Ofcom granted permission for the station to extend its editorial coverage to the Fylde Coast taking in Lytham St Annes and Blackpool covering the North West Coast of England.

The station offers a full range of programmes 24 hours a day.
A recent tie in with local bus operator Peoplesbus saw the launch of the 'Sandgrounder Shuttle' - a fully branded bus to be used on promotional trips. The bus has an eye catching all over livery featuring the images of a number of presenters.

History 

The station started life as a 28-day RSL (Restricted Service Licence) covering Southport on FM in November 2015.

In June 2016 the station launched full time on DAB Digital Radio covering Southport and The Liverpool City Region

In the Summer of 2020 broadcasting regulator Ofcom granted permission for the station to extend its editorial coverage to the Fylde Coast taking in Lytham St Annes and Blackpool covering the North West Coast of England.

Sandgrounder Radio serves the North West Coast of England covering Southport, The Liverpool City Region and Fylde Coast areas on DAB Digital Radio and Online .

References

Radio stations in England
Radio stations established in 2016
2016 establishments in England